Simon Reeve (born 6 September 1961) is an Australian television presenter and journalist, best known for his association with the Seven Network.

Reeve was previously the sport presenter on Weekend Sunrise and the host of Million Dollar Minute and It's Academic.

Career
Reeve commenced his career at the Seven Network in Perth, Western Australia in 1979, working as a sports producer and reporter. In 1982, he moved to London to take up a position with Vis News. Reeve returned to Australia in 1984 and joined Western Australian current affairs program State Affair and also worked on sports program What a Week. At that time he won a Penguin Award for a human interest report and was involved in the commentary team for TVW's host broadcast of the America's Cup defence in 1987. Reeve moved to the eastern states in 1987 as a journalist for Beyond 2000.

Reeve left Beyond 2000 and joined sports program Seasons in 1993, Wildlife in 1994, and spent three years as a reporter on Good Medicine. In 1999, Reeve moved to Botswana with his family. While there he established Kwando Productions, and co-produced the television series Mad Mike and Mark, broadcast internationally on Animal Planet. Reeve returned to Australia in 2001, and hosted quiz show QuizMaster in 2002, before working for Seven News and Sunrise.

Reeve was a regular fill-in news and sport presenter for Natalie Barr and Mark Beretta on Sunrise. Reeve filled in for Barr whilst she was on maternity leave in 2005. Amongst his duties on Sunrise, Simon presented the news live from the APEC Newsroom in the week leading up to APEC 2007 in September 2007. He also presented the first ever Seven Early News bulletin on 14 July 2008, as Natalie Barr was hosting Sunrise at the time. Reeve has also, along with Liz Chetkovich, held the position of commentator for Seven's gymnastics coverage for both the Athens and Beijing Olympic Games.

In 2005, Reeve began hosting the children's program, It's Academic. In 2006, Reeve was a contestant in reality singing show It Takes Two, and commenced hosting the documentary series, The Force: Behind the Line.

In January 2014, Reeve replaced Grant Denyer as host of Million Dollar Minute. In October 2014, Reeve resigned from Weekend Sunrise after nine years with the show to concentrate on Million Dollar Minute and It's Academic. However, in August 2015, Simon returned to Weekend Sunrise following the axing of Million Dollar Minute. His last appearance on Weekend Sunrise was in March 2020.

Reeve was made redundant by the Seven Network in June 2020. In September he launched legal action against the network, claiming Seven did not pay him annual leave or redundancy pay and other employee entitlements. At the centre of the lawsuit is a disagreement over whether he was considered an employee or a contractor by the network. In October 2020, Seven filed a counterclaim, seeking compensation for payments made to Reeve's company should Reeve win. Reeve reached a settlement with Seven in March 2021. Seven's counterclaim was also dismissed in light of the settlement.

Personal life
Reeve is the son of Earl Reeve who was a news presenter in Perth for ABC Television. 
Reeve's partner is Linda and together they have two children. Reeve is a strong supporter of Australian Football League club Fremantle and occasionally writes for their website.

References

External links
 Seven News profile
 It Takes Two profile

Australian game show hosts
1961 births
Living people